Urban Jungle is an artist management company, music publishing company, booking agency and  independent record label based in São Paulo, Brazil, inspired by the local Brazilian urban music scene, it has been releasing albums and representing artists like Céu, Teto Preto, Otto and Edgar among others worldwide.

Artist roster
 Céu
 Otto
 Boogarins
 Edgar
 Teto Preto

See also
 List of record labels

External links
 Official site

References 

Brazilian independent record labels
Record labels established in 2000
Electronic music record labels